The People's Revolutionary Tribunal was a tribunal established by the People's Republic of Kampuchea in 1979 to try the Khmer Rouge leaders Pol Pot and Ieng Sary in absentia for genocide.

Trial and verdict
The tribunal began seven months after the overthrow of Khmer Rouge's Democratic Kampuchea and was staffed by both Cambodian and international lawyers. The tribunal was held at Phnom Penh's Chaktomuk Theatre and transcripts of the proceedings were made available in Khmer, French and English. The court heard testimony from 39 witnesses over five days. The verdict, handed down on August 19, 1979, found the two leaders of the Khmer Rouge guilty of genocide, sentenced them to death and ordered the confiscation of their property.

Defense
 Hope Stevens

Perceptions of the trial
At that time many Western countries led by the United States dismissed the People's Republic of Kampuchea as a puppet of Vietnam and the tribunal as a show trial.

After the trial
Ieng Sary was granted a royal pardon by King Norodom Sihanouk in 1996 in exchange for his defection to the government. Pol Pot died in 1998 shortly after he was placed in house arrest by his deputy Ta Mok.

See also
Extraordinary Chambers in the Courts of Cambodia

External links
 People’s Revolutionary Tribunal Held in Phnom Penh for the Trial of the Genocide Crime of the Pol Pot - Ieng Sary Clique (August - 1979): Documents in PDF format

References

 
Cambodian genocide
Judiciary of Cambodia